The Tactical High Power Operational Responder (THOR) is a  high-energy microwave laser directed-energy weapon by the United States Air Force Research Laboratory.
The weapon uses a powerful microwave burst to produce an unspecified "counter-electronic effect", with the intention of disabiling unmanned aircraft. The THOR project is led by the Air Force Strategic Development Planning & Experimentation (SDPE) Office. The weapon is considered inventory of the United States Air Force High Energy Laser Weapon Systems (HELWS). In December of 2020, it was reported that the weapon was deployed in Africa for testing.

See also
Counter-electronics High Power Microwave Advanced Missile Project
Anti-aircraft warfare

References 

Directed-energy weapons
Directed-energy weapon of the United States